Shelley Steiner, also known as Shelley Steiner-Wetterberg (born 23 October 1961) is a Canadian fencer, who fenced in three Olympic Games and won a gold medal in the 1981 Maccabiah Games in Israel.

Biography
Steiner was born in Toronto, Canada. She lives in Montigny-sur-Loing, France.

She competed in the women's team foil events at the 1984 Summer Olympics (coming in 9th), the 1988 Summer Olympics (coming in 9th), and the 1992 Summer Olympics (coming in 12th).

Steiner won a gold medal in foil at the 1981 Maccabiah Games in Israel.

References

External links
 

1961 births
Living people
Canadian female fencers
Olympic fencers of Canada
Fencers at the 1984 Summer Olympics
Fencers at the 1988 Summer Olympics
Sportspeople from Toronto
Jewish Canadian sportspeople
Jewish female foil fencers
Competitors at the 1981 Maccabiah Games
Maccabiah Games gold medalists for Canada
Maccabiah Games medalists in fencing